Sorry! (also unofficially referred to as Sorry! '98) is a 1998 video game based on the board game of the same name. It offers classic Sorry! and also a mode called Way Sorry!, where new cards are introduced, including Bully, Buddy, Punish, and Happy. The animated pawns talk, joke, and make amusing remarks during gameplay that relate with the colors' personalities. There are cutscenes as well, which show what happens afterward when a specific color wins.
Rules are identical to normal play; however there are some options for "house rules", such as being allowed to bump teammates. Both the Classic (playing cards drawn) and Strategy (playing cards from hand) games are available.

In addition to normal play, the game provides an extra deck of cards called Way Sorry! Along with the 45 standard cards, this deck adds nine new cards. These cards are unique to this version of the game. The player can choose to play with the extra cards or not. The "Way Sorry!" deck includes the following:

There are two each of the first four cards, and one "Way Sorry!" card.

When the Player or Computer player wins the game, they can watch a cutscene, animated by Mondo Media, who at the time animated cutscenes for other Hasbro Interactive titles like Centipede and Nerf Arena Blast.

Multiplayer
The game also allows up to four players to play at the same time moving in turns. There is also a mode to play over network. Additionally a zero-player (all-CPU) game can be played.

Reception 
Charles Ardai of Computer Gaming World gave the game 3/4 stars and described it as a cute children's game, while noting adults would enjoy more involved board games.

References

External links
 https://web.archive.org/web/20070226160851/http://www.gamespot.com/pc/puzzle/sorry/

1998 video games
Video games based on board games
Video games developed in the United States
Windows games
Windows-only games